Victor Edward Willis (born July 1, 1951) is an American singer, songwriter, and actor. He is the founding member of the disco group Village People. He performed as their lead singer and was co-songwriter for all of their most successful singles. In the group, he performed costumed as a policeman or a naval officer.

The son of a Baptist preacher, Willis developed his singing skills in his father's church. With training in acting and dance, he went to New York and joined the prestigious Negro Ensemble Company. He appeared in many musicals and plays, including the original Broadway production of The Wiz in 1976 and subsequently, the Australian production.

Willis also had written and recorded several albums in the mid-1970s for independent labels and was eventually introduced to French disco producer Jacques Morali. Morali, who dubbed him the "young man with the big voice", approached Willis and said, "I had a dream that you sang lead vocals on my album and it went very, very big".

Career

Village People
Willis agreed to sing lead and background vocals under the guise of Village People, an at-that-point non-existent concept group. The album Village People was released in July 1977, including the hits "San Francisco (You've Got Me)" and "In Hollywood (Everybody is a Star)", and became a huge hit in the burgeoning disco market. After an offer from Dick Clark for the group to perform on American Bandstand, Morali and Willis were pressed to develop a "real" group around Willis to perform live. They did so by placing an ad in music trade papers for "macho" singers who "could also dance" and "must have a mustache".

Willis was soon writing songs produced by and co-written with Morali for the group and other artists, which met with success. The Village People quickly rose to the top of the charts with Willis at the helm, scoring numerous major hits such as "Macho Man", "Y.M.C.A.", "In the Navy", and "Go West".

In 1980, as preparations for a Village People feature film Can't Stop the Music were under way, Willis left the group. Although he does not appear in the movie, he wrote the lyrics for two of the film's songs, "Magic Night" and "Milkshake". Can't Stop the Music is listed among Hollywood's bigger movie flops. After Willis departed, Village People never had another hit. In an attempt to "recapture the magic", Morali convinced him to return to the group in 1982 for the album Fox on the Box. The album was released a year later in the United States as In the Street. In 1983, Willis left the group again.

In 2013, Willis appeared on the TV One series Unsung in their two-hour special retrospective on the disco era. On June 28, 2016, Willis appeared as a contestant on the show To Tell the Truth, and sang "Y.M.C.A." as the credits rolled.

Solo career

After leaving Village People, Willis declined offers to record and consistently refused to perform any of his Village People hits. In 2010, he appeared at several Major League Baseball stadiums, performing The Star-Spangled Banner and leading the crowd for the traditional Y.M.C.A. 7th-inning stretch break.

In 1979, Willis recorded a solo album which remained unreleased for over 35 years. The album, Solo Man, was finally released in August 2015.

Return to Village People
In 2017, Willis and Henri Belolo, Morali's business partner and co-owner of the group, reached an out-of-court settlement whereby Willis resumed his role as lead singer of Village People, and they resumed recording and touring internationally. In 2018, Willis announced via social media plans for upcoming Village People projects including a new studio album, a Christmas music video, and a re-issue of the group's 1979 concert originally released as the "live" portion of the album Live & Sleazy.

Copyright terminations
In 2012, the United States District Court for the Southern District of California ruled that under the provisions of the Copyright Act of 1976, Willis could terminate his copyright transfers to Scorpio Music and Can't Stop Productions, because "a joint author who separately transfers his copyright interest may unilaterally terminate the grant." Willis subsequently held a 33% share of "Go West", "Y.M.C.A.", "In the Navy", and other songs written for Village People and other acts.

In 2015, a jury determined that the sole writers of 13 songs were Morali and Willis, and the name Henri Belolo was removed, giving Willis a 50% ownership of those songs.

Personal life
Willis struggled with drugs for many years after leaving Village People and had several run-ins with the law. Following an arrest in 2006, he was given probation and ordered into rehab at the Betty Ford Clinic. In 2007, following treatment, Willis made his first statement to the press in more than 25 years, saying, "The nightmare of drug abuse is being lifted from my life ... now that the haze of drugs are gone, I'm thinking and seeing clearer now than I have in years ... I'm looking forward to living the second part of my life drug-free."

From 1978 until 1982, Willis was married to Phylicia Ayers-Allen (now Phylicia Rashad), whom he met during the run of The Wiz, and who later played Clair Huxtable on The Cosby Show. He also wrote the lyrics for her album, Josephine Superstar. On November 17, 2007, Willis married a second time to his wife, Karen, who is a lawyer and an entertainment executive.

References

External links

1951 births
Living people
Village People members
Musicians from Dallas
African-American  male singer-songwriters
American soul keyboardists
Record producers from Texas
American rhythm and blues singer-songwriters
American soul singers
Male actors from Dallas
American male stage actors
African-American male dancers
American session musicians
African-American male actors
Singer-songwriters from Texas
20th-century African-American male singers